Ken Bouchard (pronounced BOO-shard, born April 6, 1955) is an American former NASCAR driver and the 1988 Rookie of the Year. His brother Ron Bouchard was the 1981 Rookie of the Year and one-time Winston Cup Series race winner.

Modified career
Before he came to NASCAR, Bouchard was a modified racer in the Northeast. He won eleven NASCAR modified races in one season. He was voted one of NASCAR Modified’s 50 Greatest Drivers of All-Time. He then ran a part-time Busch Series schedule.
He has driven for car owners including Sonny Koszela #15, and Len Boehler #3. Bouchard had  success driving the Ted Marsh #55 in which he won several races and championships.

Winston Cup career
He made his Winston Cup debut in 1987 at the Miller American 400 at Michigan, finishing 32nd after suffering oil pressure problems. The next year, he raced full-time in Winston Cup in an unsponsored car owned by Bob Whitcomb. Despite this, he finished 8th at North Carolina Speedway and defeated promising rivals Ernie Irvan and Brad Noffsinger to become the 1988 NASCAR Rookie of the Year. In 1989, however, he was released from his ride after just four races. He returned in 1993, running three races for Thee Dixon in his #85 Safety-Kleen/Burger King Ford. He ran his last Winston Cup race in 1994 at the Hooters 500, where his #67 Ford expired after 280 laps because of valve trouble, finishing 29th. Since then, Bouchard has competed in 5 Craftsman Truck Series races. He also attempted several Winston Cup events, but failed to qualify for each of them, the last of which was the 1999 Pepsi 400, in the #84 Chevy sponsored by Island Oasis.

Driving instructor career
Bouchard now operates the Drive to Victory Lane Racing School at Thompson International Speedway. He finished 13th in the "Icebreaker 2006" NASCAR Whelen Modified Tour event at the track.

Motorsports career results

NASCAR
(key) (Bold – Pole position awarded by qualifying time. Italics – Pole position earned by points standings or practice time. * – Most laps led.)

Winston Cup Series

Daytona 500

Busch Series

Craftsman Truck Series

Busch North Series

Winston West Series

Whelen Southern Modified Tour

ARCA Bondo/Mar-Hyde Series
(key) (Bold – Pole position awarded by qualifying time. Italics – Pole position earned by points standings or practice time. * – Most laps led.)

References

External links
Official Website of Bouchard's racing school
Driver statistics at racing-reference.info

1955 births
Living people
NASCAR drivers
Sportspeople from Fitchburg, Massachusetts
Racing drivers from Massachusetts